Songhoyboro Ciine or Songhay Ciiné ( or ) is an upriver dialect of the southern Songhay dialect of Niger. It is spoken mostly in the northwestern corner of Niger's Tillaberi region, an area known as Songhay: from Gorouol, a border town with Mali, down to the towns of Tera, Anzourou, Namari Goungou and Say.

Due to the high mutual intelligibility with the prestige dialect of Zarma in Niamey, it is common for Songhoyboro Ciine speakers to use the words "Zarma" and "Songhay" interchangeably when referring to their language. Songhoyboro Ciine is not, however, intelligible with Koyraboro Senni Songhai dialect of Gao in Mali. Some  use the Peulh word "kado" (meaning; "stranger") to address this dialect although many of the dialect speakers consider it pejorative.

References

Languages of Niger
Songhay languages